Bow Down Before the Blood Court is the first studio album by Dutch death metal band Grand Supreme Blood Court. It was released on 12 November 2012 through Century Media Records. The album was made available on CD, vinyl and digital download.

Track listing

Personnel
Grand Supreme Blood Court
 Theo van Eekelen - bass
 Martin van Drunen - vocals
 Alwin Zuur - guitars
 Eric Daniels - guitars
 Bob Bagchus - drums

Miscellaneous staff
 Mick Koopman - logo 
 Lena Wurm - layout
 Frank Klein Douwel - engineering
 Harry Wijering - engineering
 Dan Swanö - mixing, mastering
 Axel Hermann - cover art
 Jeanette "Jeanny" Petrocchi - photography

References

2012 debut albums
Century Media Records albums
Grand Supreme Blood Court albums